Robinett is a surname. It is derived from the given name Robin, French diminutive of Robert. Notable people with the surname include:

 Paul Robinett (born 1970s?), American Internet personality
 Paul McDonald Robinett (1893-1975), U.S. Army general of World War II
 Stephen Robinett (1941–2004), American writer
 Thomas Robinett (born 1949), American politician, member of the Kansas House of Representatives
 Warren Robinett (born 1951), American video game designer
 Florence M. Voegelin (1927–1989), also known as Florence M. Robinett, American anthropologist and linguist

See also
Robinet (disambiguation)
Robinette (disambiguation)